Zakan-Yurt (Zaki-Evla) is a rural locality (a selo) in Achkhoy-Martanovsky District, Chechnya.

Administrative and municipal status 
Municipally, Zakan-Yurt is incorporated as Zakan-Yurtovskoye rural settlement. It is the administrative center of the municipality and is the only settlement included in it.

Geography 

Zakan-Yurt is located on the southern slope of the Sunzhensky Ridge, opposite from the confluence of the Assa River into the Sunzha River.

The nearest settlements to Zakan-Yurt are Alkhan-Kala in the east, Khambi-Irze in the south-east, Shaami-Yurt in the south-west, and Samashki in the north-west.

History 
The village was first founded in 1851 or 1853, according to different sources, with the name of Zakan-Yurtovskaya (from 1913-1924 - called Romanovskaya) as a part of the Sunzhensky Cossack line. Later, on Order number 01721, the entire Cossack population of the village was evicted. The empty village was then handed to Chechen control. It was populated by Chechens and renamed to Zakan-Yurt at this time.

In 1944, after the genocide and deportation of the Chechen and Ingush people and the Chechen-Ingush ASSR was abolished, the village of Zakan-Yurt was renamed to Prigorodnoye, and settled by people from other ethnic groups. From 1944 to 1957, it was a part of the Novoselsky District of Grozny Oblast.

In 1958, after the Vaynakh people returned and the Chechen-Ingush ASSR was restored, the village regained its old name, Zaki-Evla.

On 1 January 2020, the territory of the Samashki Forestry was transferred from Samashki to Zakan-Yurt, and became known as Zakan-Yurt Forestry.

Population 
 1990 Census: 5,093
 2002 Census: 4,928
 2010 Census: 5,835
 2019 estimate: 6,713

According to the results of the 2010 Census, the majority of residents of Zakan-Yurt were ethnic Chechens.

Infrastructure 
Zakan-Yurt hosts two secondary schools, a kindergarten, and a state farm.

References 

Rural localities in Achkhoy-Martanovsky District